Karam Farah Attia Soliman (born October 15, 1944) is an American-Egyptian pharmacologist and Distinguished Professor of Pharmaceutical Sciences at Florida A&M University.

References

External links
Karam Soliman

1944 births
Living people
American pharmacologists
Florida A&M University faculty
American toxicologists
Egyptian pharmacologists
Cairo University alumni
University of Georgia alumni